David Gerdes (born 1964) is an American astrophysicist, professor, and administrator at the University of Michigan. He is known for his research on trans-Neptunian objects, particularly for his discovery of the dwarf planet, .

Education 
Gerdes completed his undergraduate education in physics at Carleton College in Northfield, Minnesota in 1986. From 1986 to 1987, he studied applied mathematics and theoretical physics at the University of Cambridge under a Churchill Scholarship. From 1987 to 1992, he studied at the University of Chicago, eventually obtaining a PhD in physics.

Career 
Upon completing his Ph.D., Gerdes joined the University of Michigan Physics Department in 1992 as a postdoctoral research fellow, working on the Collider Detector at Fermilab (CDF) experiment.  From 1996 to 1998, he was an assistant professor of Physics and Astronomy at Johns Hopkins University. He returned to the University of Michigan Physics Department as a faculty member in 1998, and was promoted to professor in 2008. Since 2019 he has served as the department chair.

Johns Hopkins University 
At Johns Hopkins University, Gerdes contributed to early studies of the top quark and to new particle searches with the Collider Detector at Fermilab. He received an Outstanding Junior Investigator Award from the United States Department of Energy and a CAREER Award from the National Science Foundation.

University of Michigan 
In 1994, Gerdes and his collaborators on the  Collider Detector at Fermilab experiment made the first observations of the top quark subatomic particle.

Using data collected from the Dark Energy Survey between 2013 and 2018, Gerdes led a team of physicists and students at the University of Michigan which discovered hundreds of new object in the Kuiper Belt, including a previously unknown dwarf planet. Gerdes helped to develop the camera used to make the discovery, although it was originally intended to create a map of distant galaxies.

Gerdes is currently involved in efforts to locate a theorized ninth planet in the solar system. He expressed hope that the planet may have been captured in the same set of astronomical images that  was found in, and stated that he was "... excited about our chances of finding it." In 2021, Gerdes and graduate student Kevin Napier published a paper claiming that the clustering of extreme trans-Neptunian Objects, a key part of the evidence for Planet Nine, is simply an observational artifact and is not statistically significant.

Awards and distinctions 
Fellow of the American Physical Society – awarded in 2015 for contributions in particle physics related to b-quark tagging.
Provost's Teaching Innovation Prize – awarded in 2012 by the University of Michigan's Center for Research on Learning and Teaching for innovation in teaching.
Arthur F. Thurnau Professorship—awarded in 2007 for outstanding contributions to undergraduate teaching.

References

External links 
Personal website at the University of Michigan
David Gerdes on Google Scholar

Living people
American astrophysicists
University of Michigan faculty
Carleton College alumni
People associated with the University of Cambridge
University of Chicago alumni
1964 births
Fellows of the American Physical Society